Holsted Speedway Klub or Holsted Tigers is a speedway club from Holsted in Denmark, who compete in the Danish Speedway League.

History
The club was founded on 5 November 1974 by Kurt Bøgh. The original track was small and caused controversy with the Danish Motor Union over its size. In 1989 the club moved to a new track. The team now runs from the Holsted Speedway Centre. 

The team have won the Danish Speedway League title on a record 14 occasions in 1976, 1977, 1978, 1991, 1994, 1996, 2002, 2003, 2004, 2006, 2007, 2009, 2014 and 2021.

Teams

2022 team

References 

Danish speedway teams